Beiye is a township of Pingshan County in the Taihang Mountains of southwestern Hebei province, China, located around  from the border with Shanxi and  west of the county seat. , it had 39 villages under its administration.

See also
List of township-level divisions of Hebei

References

Township-level divisions of Hebei
Pingshan County, Hebei